Matija Antun Relković (also Reljković; 6 January 1732 – 22 January 1798) was Habsburg military officer and a Croatian writer.

Early life and military career 
Born in the village of Davor in Kingdom of Slavonia (today a part of Croatia) as a son of a Military Frontier officer, Relković too enlisted in the Austrian army at the age of 16. He fought in the Seven Years' War until he was captured by Prussians in Wrocław (Breslau), and spent a few years of rather "relaxed" imprisonment at Frankfurt (Oder). Relković's prison years became his Lehrjahre, his educational period: a voracious but unsystematic reader, he studied many works by leading Enlightenment writers (Voltaire, Bayle, Diderot), as well as Polish poet Jan Kochanowski's didactic epic Satir- which became the model for his most famous work. After the release, Relković spent a few more years on war campaigns (this time Bavaria), but eventually sated and bored with military life, he asked and got pension from Austrian emperor Joseph II in the rank of captain, as well as the title of hereditary noble. Having spent the rest of his life as a writer and social reformer, Relković died in Vinkovci, Croatia.

Bibliography 
Considering the deplorable state of Slavonia after the liberation from the Ottomans, Relković is, bearing in mind general backwardness of the area, extremely versatile and prolific writer. This Slavonian polymath has left indelible marks on Croatian philology, literature and general culture. Of course, almost all of his works are now only of historical interest (he possessed no authentic literary talent, nor even ambition), but, they have become so integrated in Croatian general culture that further generations of writers and philologists frequently adopted many Relković's idioms and phrases without even being conscious of it. His popular dithyrambic verses on Slavonia are, in a way, the region's motto.

Relković wrote numerous works, among which the following should be mentioned: 
 "Nova slavonska i nimačka gramatika"/New Slavonian and German grammar, published posthumously in 1860s
 "Nek je svašta iliti sabranje pametnih ričih"/Collection of wise adages, 1795, a hybrid polygraphy of aphorisms, mainly in the spirit of Rationalism and didacticism
 "Satir iliti divji čovik"/Satir or savage man, 1762, extended edition 1779, his most famous work, one of the Croatian Enlightenment bestsellers

His "Satir" is a patchwork of didactic poetry, prose, quasi-dramatic dialogues, soaked in common sense wisdom of Enlightenment and consisting mainly of pragmatic counsels on agriculture, small manufacture and, the most amusing part for the contemporary reader — sexual and behavioral codes of inhabitants of Slavonia which survived the Turkish expulsion and which were, as a sign of "Oriental" sensualism and dissoluteness, particularly abhorrent to the Rationalist moralist Relković. However — one must not be too severe in criticism of Relković's reforming zeal, since the general state of affairs in Slavonia was at so low a level that his outrage was in many ways justified.

Legacy 
Relković's enduring legacy is, even more than in the content of his didactic epic, contained in his linguistic idiom and grammatical and philological works (which, by the way, his son continued). Having spread neo-štokavian idiom in the second half of the 18th century, he is, along with Adam Tadije Blagojević and Andrija Kačić Miošić, a Dalmatian friar, considered to be one of the most decisive influences that helped shape Croatian standard language. Although modern Croatian linguists sometimes squabble about the range and actual value of his opus (some are of the opinion that Croatian owes more to the period of Baroque Slavism in early 17th century (with central authors like Bartol Kašić, Jakov Mikalja and Ivan Gundulić), or to the Ragusan writers of the late 15th century/early 16th century- crucial writers being Džore Držić and Šiško Menčetić) — no one denies Relković's popular appeal that was, at least, the final touch that helped neo-štokavian dialect prevail as the basis of Croatian.

References

1732 births
1798 deaths
People from Davor, Croatia
Croatian writers
Linguists from Croatia
People from Slavonia